The 2016 Crawley Borough Council election took place on 5 May 2016 to elect members of Crawley Borough Council in West Sussex, England. This was on the same day as other local elections.

Results

 The Labour Party governing group of councillors increased their majority, gaining one seat from the Conservative opposition. None of the unrepresented parties achieved a first or second place in any of the seats for which the election took place.

Ward by ward

Bewbush

Broadfield North

Broadfield South

Gossops Green

Ifield

Langley Green

Maidenbower

Pound Hill North

Pound Hill South and Worth

Southgate

Three Bridges

Tilgate

West Green

References

2016 English local elections
2016
2010s in West Sussex